The .404 Jeffery is a rifle cartridge designed for hunting large, dangerous game animals, such as the "Big Five" (elephant, rhino, cape buffalo, lion and leopard) of Africa. The cartridge is standardized by the C.I.P. and is also known as .404 Rimless Nitro Express. It was designed in 1905 by London based gunmaker W.J. Jeffery & Co to duplicate the performance of the .450/400 Nitro Express 3-inch in bolt-action rifles. It is very effective on large game and is favored by many hunters of dangerous game. The .404 Jeffery was popular with hunters and game wardens in Africa because of its good performance with manageable recoil. These cartridges exceed the ballistic performance of the .404 Jeffery but at the price of greater recoil and, in the case of the .416 Rigby, rifles that are more expensive.

History
Originally the .404 Jeffery was very popular with hunters in Africa and saw significant use in both British and German colonies. As the British Empire began to shrink, many of the popular British big-bore cartridges also dwindled in popularity, and the .404 Jeffery was one of them. By the 1960s it had all but disappeared from common firearm usage. This condition was mostly the result of the closing of the British ammunition giant Kynoch, which was the primary manufacturer of the .404 Jeffery and many other British cartridges. The introduction of the .458 Winchester Magnum in 1956 in the Winchester Model 70 bolt-action rifle provided an affordable alternative to the big Nitro Express rifles and cartridges. Winchester also started a marketing campaign at about this time called "Winchester in Africa" with much success. Renewed interest in heavy game rifles combined with political stability in Africa has led to a resurgence in African hunting and the rifles suited for it. Several ammunition makers like Kynoch, Norma, Federal, and Hornady are offering .404 Jeffery sporting ammunition.

A more recent development by Norma of Sweden has been the introduction of 450 gr ammunition under their African PH banner. The increase in bullet weight and sectional density improves the ballistics of the .404 Jeffery. Fired at 2,150 fps, the cartridge now outperforms most of its peers with a relatively mild recoil due to the efficient design of the cartridge.

Commercial and wildcat variations

In 1908, W.J. Jeffery & Co created the .333 Jeffery by shortening the .404 case, giving it greater taper and necking it down to .333 in (8.5 mm). In 1913, Jeffery further necked down the .333 Jeffery to .288 inches, creating the .280 Jeffery.

In recent times, the .404 case has seen a resurgence in use by wildcatters. This case has no belt, unlike many other magnum cartridges,  which can be desirable for handloading because of possible problems with case head separation with repeated reloading of belted magnum cartridges. The rimless design also contributes to smooth feeding from the box magazine of bolt-action rifles.

Some common commercial children of the .404 Jeffery case are the Remington Ultra Magnum (RUM) cartridge family, which in turn spawned the Remington Short Action Ultra Magnum (RSAUM) cartridges. Also, the Winchester Short Magnum (WSM) and the Winchester Super Short Magnum (WSSM) families are believed to derive from the 404 Jeffery case. Both the Winchester and Remington cartridges have also spawned many current wildcats, like the popular .338 Edge.

All but one (.450 Dakota, based on .416 Rigby) of the proprietary cartridges of Dakota Arms such as .375 Dakota, and the .400 Tembo by Velocity USA, and the once-famous .460 G&A, used by Jeff Cooper in his "baby" rifles, are all based on .404 Jeffery.

More examples of the popularity of creating small-bore, high-velocity cartridges based on the .404 Jeffery design are the .26 Nosler, .28 Nosler, .30 Nosler and, the latest, .33 Nosler, introduced by Nosler  between 2013 and 2016.

See also
 10 mm caliber
 List of rifle cartridges
 Table of handgun and rifle cartridges

References

 Barnes, Frank, Cartridges of the World 4th Edition, p. 329

External links
 Philip Massaro, "Behind the Bullet: .404 Jeffery", americanhunter.org, published 9 June 2017.
 Philip Massaro, "One Gun to Hunt Them All: The Historic .404 Jeffery", gundigest.com, published 2 August 2016.

Pistol and rifle cartridges
British firearm cartridges
W.J. Jeffery & Co cartridges